Blue Diamond Growers is an agricultural cooperative and marketing organization that specializes in California almonds. Founded in 1910 as the California Almond Grower's Exchange, the organization claims to be the world's largest tree nut processing and marketing company. It serves 3,500 almond growers, and helps make the almond crop (valued at over $1 billion) California's largest food export.

The company produces almonds in various forms, including roasted almonds under the "Blue Diamond" brand and almond milk under the "Almond Breeze" brand. The cooperative is privately held and does not disclose sales figures, although the Sacramento Bee estimated it to have annual sales of about $709 million in 2009.

The organization is headquartered in Sacramento, California. From 2004 to 2008, it resisted attempts by the International Longshore and Warehouse Union to organize workers at its processing plant. Blue Diamond was found by the National Labor Relations Board to have violated a federal labor law in its campaign against the union. In November 2008, however, the union lost an NLRB-supervised vote to establish a branch.

See also
 Calpak Plant No. 11
 Diamond of California – an unrelated walnut growing company (and former cooperative).

References

External links

 

Agricultural marketing cooperatives
Agriculture in California
1910 establishments in California
Companies based in Sacramento County, California
Almond production
Plant milk
Milk substitutes
Agriculture companies of the United States
Cooperatives in the United States